This is a list of terrorism films

Non-fiction
These films are about or based on actual events, they are either live-action and/or documentary.

Afghanistan 
 Charlie Wilson's War (2007)
 Lions for Lambs (2007)
 Lone Survivor (2013)
 12 Strong (2018)

Bangladesh 
 Dhaka Attack (2017)
 Jannat (2018)
 Mission Extreme (2021)
 Black War: Mission Extreme 2 (2023)

France 
 Day of the Jackal  (1973)
 L'Assaut (2010)
 Carlos (2010)
 Made in France (2015)
 Eagles of Death Metal: Nos Amis (Our Friends) (2017)
 The 15:17 to Paris (2018)

Germany 
 Munich (2005)
 The Baader Meinhof Complex (2008)

India
 Main Azaad Hoon (1989)
 Roja (1992)
 Drohkaal (1994)
 Maachis (1996)
 Dil Se.. (1998)
 Swasthik (1999)
 The Terrorist (1999)
 Vaastav: The Reality (1999)
 Azad (2000)
 Badal (2000)
 Fiza (2000)
 Mission Kashmir (2000)
 Indian (2001)
 Kannathil Muthamittal (2002)
 Khadgam (2003)
 Black Friday (2005)
 Fanaa (2006)
 Keerthi Chakra (2006)
 Dhokha (2007)
 Shootout at Lokhandwala (2007)
 Mukhbir (2008)
 Aamir (2008)
 Mission 90 Days (2008)
 Mumbai Meri Jaan (2008)
 A Wednesday! (2009)
 Kurbaan (2009)
 Mission Istanbul (2009)
 Unnaipol Oruvan (2009)
 Sikandar (2009)
 New York (2009)
 Kandahar (2010)
 Once Upon a Time in Mumbaai (2010)
 Velayudham (2011)
 Agent Vinod (2012)
 Thuppakki (2012)
 My Name Is Khan (2010)
 Once Upon ay Time in Mumbai Dobaara! (2013)
 Shootout at Wadala (2013)
 The Attacks of 26/11 (2013)
 Vishwaroopam (2013)
 Holiday (2014)
 Baby 
 Mr. X (2015)
 Phantom (2015)
 Neerja (2016)
 Airlift (2016)
 1971: Beyond Borders(2017)
 Tiger Zinda Hai (2017)
 Omerta (2017)
 Raazi (2018)
 Hotel Mumbai (2018)
 Uri: The Surgical Strike (2019)
 Blank (2019)
 India's Most Wanted (2019)
 Sooryavanshi (2021)
 Beast (2022)

Iraq 

 Saving Jessica Lynch (2003) (TV)
 Over There (2005) (TV series)
 The Tiger and the Snow (2005)
 Valley of the Wolves Iraq (2006)
 A Line in the Sand (2006)
 Redacted (2007)
 The Mark of Cain (2007) (TV)
 Body of Lies (2008)
 The Hurt Locker (2008)
 Stop Loss (2008)
 No True Glory: Battle for Fallujah (2009)
 American Soldiers (2005)
 Iraq war documentaries (2004-2007)
 Route Irish (2010)
 Three Kings (1999)
 Fair Game (2010 film)
 The Lady of Heaven (2021)

Iran 
 Syriana (2005)
 Argo (2012)
 Septembers of Shiraz (2016)

Ireland 
 Michael Collins (1996)
 The General (1998)
 The Wind That Shakes the Barley (2006)
 '71 (2014)

Libya 
 Lion of the Desert (1981)
 13 Hours: The Secret Soldiers of Benghazi (2016)

Norway 
22 July (film) (2018)
U:july 22 (film) (2019)

Pakistan 
 A Mighty Heart (2007)
 Zero Dark Thirty (2012)
 Waar (2013)
 Yalghar (2016)

Philippines 
 The Hunt of Eagle One (2006)

Saudi Arabia 
 The Kingdom (2007)

South Africa 
 Black Terrorist (1978)
 Catch a Fire (2006)
 Namibia: The Struggle for Liberation (2007)
 Endgame (2009)

Uganda 
 Who Killed Captain Alex? (2010)

United Kingdom 
 Who Dares Wins (1982) (U.S. title: The Final Option)
 Bloody Sunday (2002)
 Five Minutes of Heaven (2009)
 In the Name of the Father (1994)
 Omagh (2004)
 Hunger (2008)
 Four Lions (2010)
 Cleanskin (2012)
 Suffragette (2015)
 6 Days (2017)

United States 

 DC 9/11: Time of Crisis (2003) (TV)
 Flight 93 (2006) (TV)
 United 93 (2006)
 The Path to 9/11 (2006) (TV)
 World Trade Center (2006)
 New York (2009)
 Patriots Day (2016)

Fiction
These films are about fictional events. They are selected on the criteria based on either (1) the plots involve the use of actual or fictitious terror groups and events, or (2) the overall storyline incorporates the essence of a terror attack.  (i.e. Goldfinger (1964) was not a terror attack on Fort Knox, but rather a means for financial gains.  Thunderball (1965), although is also based on financial gains, the plot involved the use of ransom and terror to achieve this goal.)
'71 (2014)
Air Force One (1997)
Airheads (1994)
Algerian Assassin (2017)
Angel Has Fallen (2019)
Arlington Road (1999)
Back to the Future (1985)
Betrayed (1988)
Black Sunday (1977)
Blown Away (1994)
Body of Lies (2008)
The Boxer (1997)
Broken Arrow (1996)
Cal (1984)
Casino Royale (2006)
Cleanskin (2012)
The Dark Knight (2008)
The Dark Knight Rises (2012)
Dead Bang (1989)
The Crying Game (1992)
The Delta Force (1986)
The Devil's Own (1997)
 The Enforcer (1976)
Diamonds Are Forever (1971)
Die Hard (1988 - 2013)
Dr. No (1962)
Executive Decision (1996)
Eye in the Sky (2015)
Face/Off (1997)
Fifty Dead Men Walking (2008)
Five Fingers (2006)
Flightplan (2005)
The Foreigner (2017)
Homeland (2011-)
Imperium (2016)
Incredibles 2 (2018)
Invasion U.S.A (1985)
The Jackal (1997)
Jack Ryan: Shadow Recruit (2014)
The Kingdom (2007)
The Living Daylights (1987)
London Has Fallen (2016)
Nighthawks (1981)
Non-Stop (film) (2014)
Octopussy (1983)
Olympus Has Fallen (2013)
The Park Is Mine (1986)
Passenger 57 (1992)
Patriot Games (1992)
The Peacemaker (1997)
Ransom / The Terrorists (1975)
Red Eye (2005)
The Rock (1996)
Rollercoaster (1977)
Ronin (1998)
Second in Command (2006)
The Siege (1998)
Skyfall (2012)
Speed (1994)
Speed 2: Cruise Control (1997)
The Sum of All Fears (2002)
Sweet Bunch (1983)
Thunderball (1965)
Traitor (2008)
True Lies (1994)
Two-Minute Warning (1976)
Under Siege (1992)
Under Siege 2: Dark Territory (1995)
Unthinkable (2010)
Vantage Point (2008)
The World Is Not Enough (1999)
Wrong Is Right (1982)
White House Down (2013)
Zootopia (2016)

Notes

Disaster films
Lists of films by genre

Terrorism-related lists